This is a list of the suburbs, wards and landmarks located within the city of Exeter, England.

Suburbs

Wards

The city is subdivided into thirteen wards, for electoral and other purposes relating to Exeter City Council. Since boundary changes came into effect in 2016, the following is the list of current wards:

Alphington – includes the Marsh Barton industrial estate
Duryard & St James
Exwick
Heavitree
Mincinglake & Whipton
Newtown & St Leonards
Pennsylvania
Pinhoe
Priory
St David's
St Loyes
St Thomas
Topsham – includes Newcourt and the east half of Countess Wear

Built environment

Extant

Historic

Natural environment
Exeter Valley Parks 
Ludwell Valley Park
 River Exe

Sports grounds

Places of worship

Hospitals

Current hospitals

Former hospitals

References

Exeter
Exeter-related lists
 
Exeter